The Communist Party of Brazil (PCdoB) is a political party in Brazil. The PCdoB officially adheres to Marxist–Leninist theory. It has national reach and deep penetration in the trade union and student movements, but little representation in elected positions.

PCdoB shares the disputed title of "oldest political party in Brazil" with the Brazilian Communist Party (PCB). The predecessor of both parties was the Brazilian Section of the Communist International, founded on 25 March 1922. The current PCdoB was launched on 18 February 1962, in the aftermath of the Sino-Soviet split. Outlawed after the 1964 coup d'état, PCdoB supported the armed struggle against the regime before its legalization in 1988. Its most famous action in the period was the Araguaia guerrilla (1966–1974). Since 1989, PCdoB has been allied to the Workers' Party (PT) at the federal level, and, as such, it participated in the Luiz Inácio Lula da Silva administration and joined the "With the strength of the people" coalition, which elected his successor, Dilma Rousseff. In 2018, the party again allied with PT and the candidacy of Fernando Haddad. Haddad's running mate was PCdoB member Manuela d'Ávila. In 2022 it joined the Brazil of Hope coalition with the PT and the Green Party.

PCdoB publishes the newspaper Working Class (Classe Operária) as well as the magazine Principles (Princípios), and is a member of the Foro de São Paulo. Its youth wing is the Union of the Socialist Youth (União da Juventude Socialista, UJS), launched in 1984, while its trade union wing is the Central of the Workers of Brazil (Central dos Trabalhadores e Trabalhadoras do Brasil, CTB), founded in 2007 as a dissidence from the Unified Workers' Central (Central Única dos Trabalhadores, CUT).

History
The Communist Party – Brazilian Section of the Communist International (Partido Comunista – Seção Brasileira da Internacional Comunista, PC-SBIC) was founded on 25 March 1922, gathering Brazilian Communists under the same label until the international rupture in the movement that occurred after the 20th Congress of the Communist Party of the Soviet Union (CPSU) in 1956, and the 5th Congress of the PC-SBIC in 1960, when Brazilian Communists found themselves divided into two tendencies. At the 20th Congress of the CPSU, Nikita Khrushchev had delivered the so-called "Secret Speech", which denounced the abuses committed by the Soviet state under Joseph Stalin's rule. Khrushchev was considered a revisionist by supporters of the late Stalin, which led to a rupture in the Communist movement in various countries.

In Brazil, the rupture reached the party leadership, which had rebuilt PC-SBIC after the setbacks it suffered under the Estado Novo regime (1930–1945), which tried to pit workers against the party and violently repressed it. The party leadership prior to the rupture, primarily composed of revisionists, was formed in 1943 by João Amazonas, Maurício Grabois, Pedro Pomar, Diógenes Arruda Câmara, and Secretary General Luís Carlos Prestes, among others.

PC-SBIC (1922–1962)
The PC-SBIC was ideologically grounded in the writings of Karl Marx and Friedrich Engels, and in the actions of Vladimir Lenin in the aftermath of the October Revolution, advocating democratic centralism and Marxism–Leninism. It was launched on 25 March 1922 in Niterói, Rio de Janeiro, when members of the Brazilian working class took their first big step towards arranging themselves under a class organization; nine delegates, representing 50 workers, held a Congress and founded the PC-SBIC. On 4 April 1922, it was recognized as a political party by the federal government, with its manifesto being published in the Official Gazette. Following the international guidance, the party was given the name of Communist Party – Brazilian Section of the Communist International.

The nine delegates which attended the founding Congress of the PC-SBIC were Abílio de Nequete, a Lebanese Brazilian barber; Astrojildo Pereira, a journalist from Rio de Janeiro; Cristiano Cordeiro, an accountant from Recife; Hermogênio da Silva Fernandes, an electrician from Cruzeiro; João da Costa Pimenta, a linotype operator; Joaquim Barbosa, a tailor from Rio de Janeiro; José Elias da Silva, a shoemaker from Rio de Janeiro; Luís Peres, a broom seller from Rio de Janeiro; and Manuel Cendón, a Spanish-born tailor.

A series of influential parties in the Brazilian political scene emerged from the PC-SBIC, such as the Brazilian Communist Party (PCB) and the Revolutionary Communist Party (PCR), in addition to many Trotskyist and Stalinist groups. The international rupture that arose in the Communist movement after 1956 caused the PC-SBIC to split on 18 February 1962, during its 5th National Congress. At the occasion, the Manifesto – Program, which advocated the disassociation of the party with the Communist International, was approved, and the party took the name of Communist Party of Brazil (Partido Comunista do Brasil, PCdoB).

Schisms

 The Trotskyist Dissence (1928): In mid-1928, PC-SBIC suffered its first schism, when a small group of Marxist intellectuals broke with the political theses of PC-SBIC influenced by Leon Trotsky's Left Opposition, and its criticism of Stalinism prevailing as the official ideology of the Communist International and the Communist Party of the Soviet Union.
 Brazilian Communist Party (1961): In 1961, the "revisionist" group held an Extraordinary National Conference, adopting a new program, a new statute, replacing the main body of the party (The Working Class), and adopting the name of Brazilian Communist Party, keeping the acronym of PCB, until then popularly used to identify PC-SBIC. The maneuver was led by Luís Carlos Prestes, which claimed that the move made it possible for PC-SBIC to regain its legal registration – which was ultimately not obtained. The Marxist–Leninist group claimed that Prestes' move broke PC-SBIC's statute and was, therefore, illegal according to the party rules. They launched a document called The Hundred Men Letter, claiming the implementation of an extraordinary congress to validate the changes. It also criticized the new party line, accusing it of being "right-wing and opportunistic." After that, the self called "anti-revisionist" group adopted the name of Communist Party of Brazil and the acronym of PCdoB to differentiate themselves from PCB.
 Communist Revolutionary Party (1968): The Revolutionary Communist Party (Partido Comunista Revolucionário, PCR) emerged as an internal split of PCdoB in 1966, four years after the split of PC-SBIC into two parties. It was formed by activists of the student movement and the peasant leagues (a pro-agrarian reform group, considered the predecessor of MST). Its party line was that of Mao Zedong's people's war, aiming to besiege the cities from the countryside, considering the Northeast Region the best area to trigger the revolution.
 PCdoB's Red Wing (1968)
 Revolutionary Communist Party (1979)
 Communist Party of Brazil (Red Fraction) (1980s): The Partido Comunista do Brasil – Fração Vermelha originated as an anti-revisionist maoist split of the Communist Party of Brazil in the 1980's.

Reorganization of the Communist Party of Brazil

The 1st Reorganization (11 August 1943)

The National Party Conference (Conference of Mantiqueira) was held on 11 August 1943, in the era of Estado Novo, with delegates from Rio, São Paulo, Minas Gerais, Paraná, Rio Grande do Sul, Bahia, Sergipe, and Paraíba. This conference would play an enormous role in party life. The Conference reviewed the political situation and the tasks of the Party, politics, and tasks of construction and rebuilding to which it must attend. A new Central Committee was elected, for the old leadership and the party organization was almost torn apart due to arrests by the police. Defeated factions dissolved, and a need to reorganize the party was established, as well as an outlining the tasks of communists in the struggle against fascism, and a declaration of war on the Axis, sending an expeditionary force to fight in Europe. Many Communists marched willingly into the theater of operations in Italy, and the Party organized a broad movement in solidarity with the Brazilian Expeditionary Force (FEB). On 1 August 1950, the Manifesto of August, was released to the public from the Central Committee of Communist Party of Brazil. An attempt to break with the remnants of the "right-wing" and "opportunist" line of the period under review, the Manifesto presented, in essence, a revolutionary line, urging the people to overthrow the regime of landlords and capitalists in the service of American imperialism, and to provide for this a popular army.

The 2nd Reorganization (18 February 1962)

At the 5th National Conference Meetings, held on 18 February 1962, in São Paulo, with the dissent of Marxist-Leninist tendencies, the party was reorganized. Delegates from Guanabara, São Paulo, Rio, Rio Grande do Sul and Espirito Santo were in attendance. Embracing the acronym and symbol PCdoB, the party was proclaimed the legitimate successor of the Communist Party – Brazilian Section of the Communist International (PC-SBIC). This conference marked a break with Luís Carlos Prestes, who had usurped the party leadership in 1943 and reorganized it along a revisionist line. In opposition to the revisionist line of the 5th Congress, the Conference adopted the Manifesto-Program, which draws a revolutionary line, reintroduced the Statute adopted at the Fourth Congress, adopted a resolution on the unity of the Communists, signed the principle that each country can only exist a single Marxist–Leninist party, decided to reissue The Working Class, a former central organ of the Party, approved the break with the USSR, and, finally, elected a new Central Committee. These historic resolutions mark not only a decisive break with the revisionists, but also purposed the organization of a true Marxist–Leninist vanguard in this conference Brazil. These meetings were attended by Joao Amazonas, Mauricio Grabois, Camara Ferreira, Mário Alves, Jacob Gorender, Miguel Batista de Carvalho, and Apollonius.

Maoist guideline (1962–1969)

The crisis between the Soviet Union and China reached its peak when the Chinese leader Mao Zedong criticized the ongoing process of de-Stalinization in the USSR, and accused Khrushchev of "opportunistic" and "reformist" deviations. A division of Mao with the rest of the communist movement attracted the sympathy of the PCdoB, who sent emissaries to Beijing to formalize the ideological link with the new ideological guidelines of the Communist Party of China. Among these messengers was the party's exiled former president, Joao Amazonas, who was received by Mao Zedong. Subsequently the party gravitated towards Maoism, considering only China and Albania socialist countries, and asserting that others were no longer revolutionary, but revisionist.

However, adherence to Maoism included a shift in the strategies of the PCdoB. Following the principle of protracted people's war, PCdoB undertook to transfer ideology to the field, initiating the formation of a peasant army. This conception of revolutionary struggle contrasted with both the traditional tactics of the PCB (which true to the "peaceful path" opposed the armed struggle against the dictatorship) and with Foco new forces such as the MR-8 and the ALN, which prioritized the urban guerrilla and focus as a way of fighting the military government established in 1964.

The final adoption of Maoism by the PCdoB was in 1966 at its 6th Congress. The following year, the party drew up a declaration in support of the Cultural Revolution underway in China. In 1968, PCdoB suffered two internal splits: the Red Wing of PCdoB (favorable to foquista tactics) and the Revolutionary Communist Party (PCR).

The Araguaia Guerrilla (1969–1976)

Forward from 1966, PCdoB sought to form a nucleus guerrilla camp. The area chosen for the irradiation of the future peasant army (along a Maoist line) was a region south of Para, near the border with Tocantins. It is estimated that the party met 70–80 guerrillas in the area under the military command of former military Osvaldo Orlando da Costa (Osvaldão) and under the command of Mauritius maximum Grabois (then commander in chief of the guerrillas).

The most effective guerrilla of the PCdoB column (under the name "Araguaia Guerrilla Force") was composed of high school and college students, organized around the Patriotic Union of Youth (UJP, youth wing of the party), professionals, and workers mainly from São Paulo and Minas Gerais. As there was originally little adhesion between locals, the party created the Freedom Union and the People's Rights (ULDP), whose manifesto contained the programmatic basis of the guerrillas.

In 1971, Army units discovered the location of the guerrilla nucleus and were deployed to cordon off the area, preventing it from spreading its operations to the north of the Amazon. The repression of guerrilla operations began in 1972, with three military expeditions that mobilized 25,000 soldiers. While the first two were repelled, the third expedition defeated the last pockets of resistance. Most of the guerillas died in clash with Army forces, including Osvaldão Grabois and Maurice, who died in confrontation with the Army on 25 December 1973. In the 3rd campaign of annihilation, the Army used "dirty tactics", including torture of civilians, and execution and beheading of prisoners, hiding the bodies where they would remain unknown for decades.

The defeat of the Araguaia would establish the ideal of the PCdoB guerrillas as the most effective and experienced of armed struggle the dictatorship. Most of the dead in the repression of the military regime between 1964 and 1979 would be PCdoB militants. The Araguaia Guerrilla redefined the dictatorship's plans for the Amazon region, whose repressions in the region were hidden long after the dictatorship's fall.

The abandonment of Maoism (1976–1979)

In the late 1960s, Marxist–Leninist Popular Action (APML), a group derived from the Catholic left, adopted a Maoist ideology and approached the PCdoB. The two groups were merged in 1975, after the end of armed struggle. PCdoB also attracted former members of Pcbr and MR-8.

On 16 December 1976, the DOI-Codi-SP invaded a house on Pius XI Street, São Paulo, killing Pedro Pomar and Ângelo Arroio, torturing João Batista Drumond to death, and taking prisoner Wladimir Pomar (son of Pedro), Aldo Arantes, Haroldo Lima, and Elza Monnerat (the latter two former members of the AP), in an episode that would become known as the Massacre or Slaughter of Lapa. In a climate where the opposition was beginning to gain strength, news coverage of the event resulted in shock and emotion within and outside Brazil. The party leadership, hit hard, began to operate with a core base in exile. Years later, it was discovered that the operation had the help of an informer arrested that year, the head of the PCdoB, Manoel Jover Teles (ex CC member of the PCB and former Pcbr), who was subsequently expelled from the party in 1983.

Shorn of its main cadres, PCdoB began to regroup with staff from the PA leadership and staff of João Amazonas, who, with Diógenes Arruda, were the last remnants of the group that rebuilt the party in 1962. Arruda's death (in 1979) left Amazonas as Secretary of the PCdoB until his death.

Observing the failure of the rural guerrilla and the new policy adopted by China since Mao's death in 1976, PCdoB decided to break with Maoism. In 1978, the party followed Enver Hoxha in his criticism of Chinese leaders, and considered Albania alone as a socialist country, the last bulwark of Marxism-Leninism.

During this period, an internal split in the PCdoB led to the formation of the Revolutionary Communist Party (PRC), led by José Genoíno and Tarso Genro, which would later join the Workers Party (PT) alongside the Ala Vermelha or Red Wing.

The path to legalization (1979–1987)

The adoption of the new Albanian line did not mean the political radicalization of the PCdoB. In 1978, the party had begun participating in institutional action through the MDB, the moderate opposition to the military government. PCdoB resumed its parliamentary activity and secretly elected its first MPs from within the MDB.

In 1979, with the granting of Amnesty, PCdoB found a favorable environment for their penetration of the unions and student organizations. John Amazonas returned from exile in 1979, and Diogenes Arruda died of a heart attack in the car on the way to a political act. The rebuilding of UNE (1979) with Aldo Rebelo marked the beginning of the hegemony of the party in university entity (continuing ever since, except for the biennium 1987–1988). In 1984, PCdoB founded the Union of Socialist Youth (UJS), its youth wing.

In unionism, PCdoB initially adopted a policy of alliance with trade unionists linked to the PCB, adhering to CONCLAT in 1983, which included moderates and non-Marxists. The party was opposed to the CUT (trade union arm of the PT). In 1984, PCdoB integrated into the Direct Elections Now movement (formed by all opposition parties). The following year, with the defeat of the amendment Dante de Oliveira which would have provided for the direct election of Presidents, the party nominated Tancredo Neves as their candidate in the Electoral College, with the joint support of the PCB and MR8, in application for the democratization and legalization of leftist parties, which would be obtained in 1985. In elections to the Constituent Assembly of 1986, PCdoB elected six deputies, including Haroldo Lima, and Aldo Arantes. Of these, three were originally elected as part of the PMDB, with which they remained an ally, as part of the base of support for the government of Jose Sarney.

A socialist program (1987–1995)

The social and economic crisis that followed the Cruzado Plan (1987) led PCdoB to break the PMDB. In its place, the party sought a broader alliance with the PT and the PSB. In 1988, trade unionists PCdoB broke with the General Workers Central and formed the current Class Union, which then became part of the CUT, currently connected to the CTB (see Recent Events).

In 1989, along with the PSB, PCdoB supported the candidacy of PT's Luiz Inácio Lula da Silva for the presidency. The alliance with the PT for the presidential elections was repeated in the elections of 1994, 1998, 2002, and 2006, achieving success in the last two, with the vice president of the ticket, the political and textile businessman José Alencar, from the PL.

Also with the PT, PCdoB also was in opposition to the government of Fernando Collor. PCdoB argued for his removal, which occurred in September 1992 with large student demonstrations, participated in by the UJS along with the UBEs and UNE. At that time, they noted the personal leadership of Lindberg Farias, then president of the UNE and militant member of the PCdoB. Alongside the adoption of a more radical stance internally, PCdoB began to lose its external references. In 1990, a year after the fall of the Berlin Wall, the Albanian regime also collapsed, and, with it, Stalinism was in crisis. The main impact of these changes was the decision of PCdoB at its 8th Congress in 1992, with the slogan Vive Socialism, that Stalinism had failed, and to move closer to "classical" Marxism.

That decision opened the party ideologically and allowed the incorporation of new members and alliances. PCdoB resumed ties with Cuba, and, in 1995, at its 8th conference, the party adopted its Socialist Programme. Several Communist intellectuals previously attached to the PCB (as Nelson Werneck Sodré and Edgard Carone) also approached the PCdoB.

During this period, with the fall of the socialist bloc in Eastern Europe, PCdoB regarded itself as in a phase of "strategic defensive", i.e. a period of the retraction of socialist ideas, motivating the need for an accumulation of forces to advance an offensive stage.

Lula administration and opposition to neoliberalism
In the late 1980s, PCdoB supported the formation of a popular front to launch Luiz Inácio Lula da Silva's candidacy for President. Since then, it has been a member of all electoral coalitions led by the Workers' Party (PT) at the federal level. It has also allied itself with the PT in most states and capitals.

The PCdoB has registered a generally steady increase in its number of seats in the National Congress since the 1986 elections, the first parliamentary elections which the party contested. It elected 3 deputies in 1986, 5 in 1990, 10 in 1994, 7 in 1998, 12 in 2002, 13 in 2006, and 15 in 2010. In 2000, PCdoB elected its first mayor, Luciana Santos (Olinda). In 2006, it elected its first Senator ever, Inácio Arruda (although the party considers Luís Carlos Prestes, from PC-SBIC, its first Senator.) He was joined by their second Senator, Vanessa Grazziotin, in 2010. Since 2001, the party is led by Renato Rabelo (a former member of the Popular Action guerrilla group), who succeeded João Amazonas who died in the following year.

With the victory of Lula in 2002, PCdoB became part of the federal government, occupying the Ministry of Sports; first with Agnelo Queiroz, and later with Orlando Silva. This was the first time that a Communist occupied a Ministry of the Brazilian state. PCdoB's influence over the federal government was expanded in 2004, with the appointment of deputy Aldo Rebelo as political coordinator for the government. The following year, he assumed the presidency of the Chamber of Deputies with the resignation of Severino Cavalcanti. On 16 November 2006, Aldo Rebelo took over the presidency for one day, making him the only Communist President of Brazil. PCdoB also managed to get some participation in the Senate for a brief period of time, when Senator Leomar Quintanilha (formerly a member of PMDB) switched parties.

Although critical of the economic policy of the Lula administration, PCdoB maintained its support to PT. In 2006, when Lula sought his re-election, the party formalized its participation in his alliance. That same year, PCdoB achieved its first municipal administration of a state capital when PT's Marcelo Déda resigned in order to run as Governor of Sergipe and Edvaldo Nogueira took office as mayor of Aracaju. At the end of 2007, its divergences with PT began to increase, and PCdoB abandoned the Central Única dos Trabalhadores (CUT) trade union organization, and, along with the Brazilian Socialist Party and other independent sections of the union movement, it founded the Central of Male and Female Workers of Brazil (CTB).

In 2005, the XI Party Congress was held and recast its status, and, among other innovations, admitted for the first time the distinction between "affiliated" and "militant" – this was for subsidiaries to help finance the party and fulfill its obligations. This move is seen as a step toward the massification of the Communist Party of Brazil.

On 21–23 November 2008, PCdoB hosted the 10th International Meeting of Communist and Workers Parties, which gathered 65 communist and labour parties from around the world, an event which had never been hosted in Latin America. That same year, it had its largest expansion of local representation, electing 40 mayors; some of them in big cities such as Aracaju, Olinda, Maranguape, and Juazeiro.

In 2009, at the 12th Congress, PCdoB adopted a new Socialist Program, entitled "Strengthening the Nation is the way, socialism is the way!" It covers only the initial phase of transition to socialism, determining the need for collective party action on some issues in the immediate to medium term.

Structure
PCdoB was legally recognized as a political party by the Brazilian Electoral Supreme Court on 23 June 1988. Its current President is Luciana Santos. It has nearly 240,000 members.

Ideology
PCdoB responded to the collapse of communist regimes in Eastern Europe and the dissolution of the Soviet Union better than most Western communist parties. PCdoB originally established itself as an organization historically linked to the Marxist-Leninist tradition of the Communist International. Its political and ideological identity was consolidated as opposing the so-called 1960s "revisionism", identified with the directions taken by the USSR after the 20th Congress of the Communist Party of the Soviet Union. PCdoB then aligned itself with Maoism. After the People's Republic of China began making economic reforms in 1979, PCdoB decided to align itself with the Socialist People's Republic of Albania, an example of consistency and fidelity to Marxism–Leninism in the opinion of its leaders.

In the 1980s, the Soviet crisis was assessed by PCdoB as the result of the growing integration of the USSR with capitalism and the "social-imperialistic" policies applied by it; the Soviet regime was characterized as a kind of state capitalism. In 1991, as the crisis had reached Albania, PCdoB decided to reassess its theoretical formulations about revisionism, and became nonaligned. At its 8th Congress in 1992, PCdoB innovated itself by criticizing the Bolshevik experience. The party reaffirmed its adherence to Marxism–Leninism and socialism, taking a different path from several other Communist organizations throughout the world.

During this process, PCdoB ranged from an approach that pointed to the class struggle as responsible for the fundamental changes that occurred in the Soviet regime, while on the other hand, it showed an economistic tendency, placing the problems of socialism around the development of productive forces. To some extent, it has shifted from debating these fundamental issues, and, when it did, it treated them marginally.

The party has also been marked by a growing institutionalization inside the political system. This can be perceived in a letter sent to the Communist Party USA on the occasion of its 29th National Convention in 2010. In it, PCdoB demonstrates its concern over the Greek economic collapse and blames neoliberal policies for it. The party lists its electoral goals for the 2010 general elections as being the "consolidation of Communist presence in the institutions", the "enlargement of influence on lower classes" and "maintaining the democratic and progressive forces at the head of the national government".

Congresses of the Communist Party of Brazil

Electoral results

Presidential elections

Legislative elections

Famous members

 Jandira Feghali
 João Amazonas †
 Jorge Mautner
 Leci Brandão
 Manuela d'Ávila
 Martinho da Vila
 Maurício Grabois †
 Nasi
 Vanessa Grazziotin
 Abílio de Nequete †

See also
 List of political parties in Brazil
 List of communist parties
 Politics of Brazil

Notes

Bibliography

References

External links
  
  Vermelho, Communist Party of Brazil news agency
  Union of Socialist Youth (UJS) official website
  Communist Party of Brazil texts in English

 
Communist parties in Brazil
Political parties in Brazil
International Meeting of Communist and Workers Parties